Bridsonia is a genus of flowering plants belonging to the family Rubiaceae.

Its native range is Southern Africa.

Species:

Bridsonia chamaedendrum

References

Rubiaceae
Rubiaceae genera